Joseph Jean Jules Ambroise Ducrot (13 August 1866 – 25 September 1915) was a French fencer. He competed in the men's foil event at the 1900 Summer Olympics.

Personal life
Ducrot served as a chef de bataillon in the 21st Colonial Infantry Regiment of the French Army during the First World War. He was killed in action in Marne on 25 September 1915.

References

External links
 

1866 births
1915 deaths
French male foil fencers
Olympic fencers of France
Fencers at the 1900 Summer Olympics
Sportspeople from Eure
French Army officers
French military personnel killed in World War I